Barr Township may refer to:
 Barr Township, Macoupin County, Illinois
 Barr Township, Daviess County, Indiana
 Barr Township, Cambria County, Pennsylvania

Township name disambiguation pages